Jack Gunston (born 16 October 1991) is a professional Australian footballer who plays for the Brisbane Lions in the Australian Football League (AFL).

Early life
Gunston was raised in Melbourne in Beaumaris and attended Haileybury College, playing school football alongside three other future AFL players (Tom Scully, Jack Hutchins, and Tom Lynch). His father, Ray Gunston, played VFA football for Brunswick, and later moved into sports administration. Gunston began his junior career with the Beaumaris Football Club. He originally played mainly as a midfielder, but after growing  in two years he began to play more in key positions.  In 2009, the year he became eligible for the AFL Draft, Gunston was selected for the Sandringham Dragons, a TAC Cup team. Early in the season, he dislocated his elbow in a practice game, an injury which took eight weeks to heal. Gunston played for the Dragons in only their last six matches, but was nonetheless a second-round pick in the 2009 AFL National Draft, taken by Adelaide with the 29th pick overall.

AFL career

Adelaide (2010–2011)
Gunston made his AFL debut against the Brisbane Lions in 9th round of the 2010 AFL season. In a promising debut Gunston collected seven disposals and kicked a vital goal in the final quarter. He played one more game in round 18 against Richmond collecting nine disposals.
He finished the year on the wing with Central District's 2010 premiership Side.

In 2011 he played 12 games, kicking five goals against Richmond in round 23.

After two years in Adelaide, Gunston became homesick and sought to return to Victoria.  He refused to participate in the finals series for Central District, choosing to return home to Victoria before the end of the SANFL season. Adelaide had awarded him the Mark Bickley Award as the club's best young player, but he was stripped of the title after announcing his intention to leave.

Hawthorn (2012–2022)
He was traded to Hawthorn in a deal that saw three draft picks (pick 24, 46 & 64) given to Adelaide and two picks returned (pick 53 and 71).

In his first season at Hawthorn he played 19 games, including the 2012 Grand Final, and followed up in 2013 with 23 games.

Gunston played in the 2013 Grand Final against Fremantle, and was one of the best players on the ground, kicking 4 goals to be the leading goal scorer in the match and finishing second in the Norm Smith Medal count to teammate Brian Lake. Gunston played an important role as key forward in 2014, finishing with a career high 58 goals for the season, and earning his second premiership as Hawthorn triumphed in the Grand Final. In 2015 Gunston was Hawthorn's leading goalkicker, kicking 57 goals. He injured his knee in the Qualifying Final against the West Coast Eagles, but returned in the Grand Final to kick 4 goals, in Hawthorn's three-peat victory against the Eagles once more.

In 2016, Gunston was forced to take on new roles due to the season-ending injury received by Jarryd Roughead, occasionally moving into the centre. Regardless, he kicked 51 goals over the Home-and-Away season and the finals, and was widely regarded as being in excellent form.

Gunston had a poor beginning to 2017, not kicking a large amount of goals. As both a result of this and large number of injuries suffered by Hawthorn's key defenders, Gunston was moved into the backline, where he significantly improved his performance.

Gunston was moved back into the forward line for 2018. He enjoyed good form, forming a forward partnership with Luke Breust with the pair kicking a combined 105 goals between them. Gunston personally kicked 48 goals and came equal 6th in the Coleman Medal.

In February 2019, it was announced that Gunston had been appointed Vice-Captain, alongside new Captain, Ben Stratton. His forward partnership with Breust was not as effective as the previous season, with the pair kicking only a combined 60 goals between them, and Hawthorn missing the finals. 

Gunston missed the majority of the 2021 season, playing just one game. He suffered a back injury that required surgery, before a premature comeback and recurrence of the injury required further surgery to correct the issue. 

Gunston returned to full fitness in the 2022 season, finishing with 32 goals from 16 games and ending the season rated as 'above average' for marks inside 50, goals and score involvements.

Gunston has collected 47 Brownlow Medal votes over the course of his career.

Brisbane Lions (2023–)
However, in order to avoid diluting their free agency compensation for losing Daniel McStay, the Lions instead sought to trade for Gunston, ultimately acquiring him on 11 October in exchange for AFL draft pick 48 and a future fourth round selection.

Playing style
Gunston has a reputation for being very accurate in kicking for goal from set shots, being frequently described as a "sharp-shooter". He is said to have a "very balanced, methodical set-shot routine", with a focus on a straight drop-ball. Towards the end of the 2013 season, it was reported that Gunston had the best conversion rate out of the top 50 goal-kickers in the competition, with 82.5 percent of his set shots from the past two seasons resulting in goals.

Statistics
Updated to the end of the 2022 season.

|-
| 2010 ||  || 28
| 2 || 1 || 0 || 11 || 5 || 16 || 5 || 4 || 0.5 || 0.0 || 5.5 || 2.5 || 8.0 || 2.5 || 2.0 || 0
|-
| 2011 ||  || 6
| 12 || 19 || 11 || 90 || 39 || 129 || 60 || 21 || 1.6 || 0.9 || 7.5 || 3.3 || 10.8 || 5.0 || 1.8 || 0
|-
| 2012 ||  || 19
| 19 || 39 || 22 || 139 || 87 || 226 || 78 || 29 || 2.1 || 1.2 || 7.3 || 4.6 || 11.9 || 4.1 || 1.5 || 0
|-
| bgcolor=F0E68C | 2013# ||  || 19
| 23 || 46 || 17 || 228 || 127 || 355 || 128 || 57 || 2.0 || 0.7 || 9.9 || 5.5 || 15.4 || 5.6 || 2.5 || 1
|-
| bgcolor=F0E68C | 2014# ||  || 19
| 23 || 58 || 27 || 238 || 132 || 370 || 137 || 41 || 2.5 || 1.2 || 10.3 || 5.7 || 16.1 || 6.0 || 1.8 || 6
|-
| bgcolor=F0E68C | 2015# ||  || 19
| 24 || 57 || 35 || 277 || 119 || 396 || 179 || 52 || 2.5 || 1.5 || 11.5 || 5.0 || 16.5 || 7.5 || 2.2 || 7
|-
| 2016 ||  || 19
| 24 || 51 || 33 || 260 || 125 || 385 || 154 || 71 || 2.1 || 1.4 || 10.8 || 5.2 || 16.0 || 6.4 || 3.0 || 4
|-
| 2017 ||  || 19
| 22 || 19 || 11 || 278 || 138 || 416 || 132 || 58 || 0.9 || 0.5 || 12.6 || 6.3 || 18.9 || 6.0 || 2.6 || 6
|-
| 2018 ||  || 19
| 23 || 51 || 32 || 292 || 117 || 409 || 125 || 46 || 2.2 || 1.4 || 12.7 || 5.1 || 17.8 || 5.4 || 2.0 || 10
|-
| 2019 ||  || 19
| 20 || 26 || 21 || 221 || 89 || 310 || 111 || 46 || 1.3 || 1.1 || 11.1 || 4.5 || 15.5 || 5.6 || 2.3 || 5
|-
| 2020 ||  || 19
| 16 || 31 || 21 || 133 || 48 || 181 || 68 || 22 || 1.9 || 1.3 || 8.3 || 3.0 || 11.3 || 4.3 || 1.4 || 5
|-
| 2021 ||  || 19
| 1 || 0 || 0 || 6 || 1 || 7 || 1 || 2 || 0.0 || 0.0 || 6.0 || 1.0 || 7.0 || 1.0 || 2.0 || 0
|-
| 2022 ||  || 19
| 16 || 32 || 24 || 129 || 43 || 172 || 70 || 22 || 2.0 || 1.5 || 8.1 || 2.7 || 10.8 || 4.4 || 1.4 || 3
|- class="sortbottom"
! colspan=3| Career
! 225 !! 430 !! 254 !! 2302 !! 1070 !! 3372 !! 1248 !! 471 !! 1.9 !! 1.1 !! 10.2 !! 4.8 !! 15.0 !! 5.5 !! 2.1 !! 47
|}

Notes

Honours and achievements
Team
 3× AFL premiership player: 2013, 2014, 2015
 2× Minor premiership: 2012, 2013

Individual
 All-Australian team: 2018
 Peter Crimmins Medal: 2020
  vice-captain: 2019
 3× Hawthorn leading goalkicker: 2015, 2016, 2020
 2×  most consistent player: 2018, 2020
  best player in finals: 2013
  best first year player (debut season): 2012
  goal of the year: 2022
 22under22 team: 2014
 Australia international rules football team: 2017

Personal life
Gunston's partner is Melbourne model Dani Shreeve.

References

External links

Living people
1991 births
People educated at Haileybury (Melbourne)
Adelaide Football Club players
Hawthorn Football Club players
Hawthorn Football Club Premiership players
Sandringham Dragons players
Central District Football Club players
Australian rules footballers from Melbourne
Box Hill Football Club players
Australia international rules football team players
All-Australians (AFL)
Peter Crimmins Medal winners
Three-time VFL/AFL Premiership players